"Woman to Woman" is a song written by Billy Sherrill, and recorded by American country music artist Tammy Wynette. It was released in July 1974 as the only single from her album of the same name. The song peaked at number 4 on the Billboard Hot Country Singles chart. It also reached number 1 on the RPM Country Tracks chart in Canada.

Cover versions
"Woman to Woman" was covered by Wynonna Judd on the 1998 album Tammy Wynette Remembered. Judd's version peaked at number 62 on the Billboard Hot Country Singles & Tracks chart.

Chart performance

Tammy Wynette

Wynonna Judd

References

1974 singles
Tammy Wynette songs
Songs written by Billy Sherrill
Wynonna Judd songs
Epic Records singles
Asylum Records singles
1974 songs